Philippe Desavoye (born 17 February 1965) is a French boxer. He competed in the men's flyweight event at the 1988 Summer Olympics.

References

1965 births
Living people
French male boxers
Olympic boxers of France
Boxers at the 1988 Summer Olympics
Sportspeople from Seine-Maritime
Flyweight boxers